Cavill Avenue is a street and a pedestrian mall in Surfers Paradise, Gold Coast, Queensland, Australia. It is in the heart of the Surfers Paradise shopping and entertainment district. It was named in honour of the man credited as the founder of Surfers Paradise, James Cavill, known as Jim Cavill.

History 
In 1887, German immigrant Johann Meyer operated a ferry across the Nerang River. From Southport, travellers would follow the Meyer's Ferry Road (now Ferry Road) to a spit of land that created a narrow point in the river (the narrow spit is no longer in existence due to changes in the river and the creation of Chevron Island but is in the vicinity of the Gold Coast Arts Centre). From that point, Meyer's ferry would take the travellers across the river to Meyer's Ferry Road at Elston (as Surfers Paradise was then known) along which the travellers would walk to the surf beach. Businesses established along Meyer's Ferry Road at Elston which created the main street of Surfers Paradise now known as Cavill Avenue. Although the surf beaches of Elston were a popular destination, the lack of road access limited the extent of residential and commercial development. 

It was not until 1925, when the Jubilee Bridge was built across the Nerang River between Southport and Main Beach, that Surfers Paradise was opened up for tourism and associated development.  During the same period Jim Cavill built the Surfers Paradise Hotel on the south eastern corner of Ferry Road and the South Coast Road. 

In 1945, in response to a letter from Mr. E Shersby to name streets after local pioneers, the Southport Town Council decided to rename the section of Ferry Road east of the Nerang River, and in front of the Surfers Paradise Hotel, in honour of Jim Cavill.  It was decided to name the section of Ferry Road west of the Nerang River after Johann Meyer.

Geography 
Between the Surfers Paradise Beach and Orchid Avenue, Cavill Avenue is a pedestrian mall. The Centro Surfers Paradise is a major shopping centre on pedestrian section of Cavill Avenue. The Circle on Cavill is the second shopping center on the street, located at the western end of the road, near the Gold Coast Highway.

Located near the intersection of Surfers Paradise Boulevard and Cavill Avenue is the G:link Cavill Avenue Station. The G:link is the Gold Coast's new light rail system connecting Broadbeach with Helensvale via Surfers Paradise, Main Beach, Southport, Gold Coast University Hospital and Parkwood

The Soul is a 243 m tall skyscraper and the second tallest skyscraper on the Gold Coast behind Q1. The building is situated on the Esplanade just to the north of Cavill Avenue.  At the river end of the street are the two towers of Circle on Cavill.

Events 
The mall is the centre of the annual Schoolies celebrations.  According to crime statistics the mall is an alcohol fueled violence hotspot.

See also

List of red-light districts

References

History of Gold Coast, Queensland
Roads on the Gold Coast, Queensland
Tourism on the Gold Coast, Queensland
Surfers Paradise, Queensland
Entertainment districts in Australia
Red-light districts in Australia
Tourist attractions on the Gold Coast, Queensland